"This Is It" is a song co-written and recorded by American country music singer Scotty McCreery. It was released to digital retailers on March 9, 2018 and was released to radio on May 7, 2018. The song is the second single released from his fourth studio album Seasons Change (2018).

History
McCreery wrote the song with Frank Rogers and Aaron Eshuis two weeks before proposing to his longtime girlfriend. He sang the song at his wedding reception.

Music video
The song's music video was directed by Jeff Ray. The music video features real-life footage from McCreery's wedding.

Commercial performance
The song was certified Platinum by the RIAA for combined streams and sales of 1,000,000 units on July 31, 2019. It has sold 115,000 copies in the United States as of April 2019.

Charts

Weekly charts

Year-end charts

Certifications

References

2018 singles
2018 songs
Country ballads
2010s ballads
Scotty McCreery songs
Song recordings produced by Frank Rogers (record producer)
Songs written by Frank Rogers (record producer)
Songs written by Aaron Eshuis
Songs written by Scotty McCreery
Thirty Tigers singles